The Subcommittee on Technology, Information Policy, Intergovernmental Relations and Procurement Reform is a subcommittee within the United States House Committee on Oversight and Government Reform.

Members, 112th Congress

References

External links
Subcommittee Homepage

Oversight Technology, Information Policy, Intergovernmental Relations and Procurement Reform
Government procurement in the United States